is a Japanese manga series written and illustrated by Gido Amagakure. It was serialized in Kodansha's seinen manga magazine Good! Afternoon from March 2013 to August 2018, with its chapters collected in twelve tankōbon volumes. An anime television series adaptation animated by TMS Entertainment aired in Japan between July and September 2016.

Plot
Kōhei Inuzuka is a teacher who has been raising his daughter, Tsumugi, by himself following the death of his wife. Having mostly bought ready-made meals for his daughter since, Kōhei's encounter with one of his students, Kotori Iida, leads him to take up cooking in order to provide proper meals for Tsumugi.

Characters

He is the single father of Tsumugi whose wife died due to an unknown illness half a year before the start of the story. Kind-hearted, hard-working and optimistic, Kohei strives to provide the best possible life for his daughter. He teaches mathematics at Kotori's high school and is her class's assistant homeroom adviser. Initially depicted as having a plain-looking and unassuming appearance, Kohei is also quite thin because he was never an avid eater even when his wife was still alive. Upon witnessing his daughter's enthusiasm towards eating home cooked meals, he began meeting up with Kotori for him to learn the basics of cooking; the three of them often hang out at Megumi's (the name of Kotori's mother) restaurant in order to prepare and eat meals together. Though relatively inexperienced in regards to cooking, Kohei is a willing learner, has steady hands (he is skillful enough with a sewing machine to make a birthday dress for Tsumugi) and is very keen in following instructions, albeit being flustered whenever something is not in the recipe. As the series progresses, he not only gains considerable culinary skills but he also deepens his bond with Tsumugi as well as with their relatives and friends.

Kohei's adorable daughter who attends kindergarten. Though energetic, she is well behaved and loves her father dearly. She always thinks of him and begins to truly enjoy eating when her father and Kotori start making meals together. She has large fluffy hair and is a fan of magical girls especially the fictional series Magi-Girl-(マグニ女の子). She likes meat, particularly hamburger steak, and doesn't like bell peppers. She has a stuffed animal of Mr. Galigali-(the mascot of Magi-Girl), a pink creature with the mixture of a sheep, a pig, and a rabbit.

 Somewhat a loner of a high school girl, who usually doesn't mind being with herself as long as there is good food on hand, Kotori is ecstatic whenever she is in the midst of eating food that pleases her taste buds. As an only child of divorced parents, she and her mother Megumi have gotten very close to each other. But when Megumi has to accept work as a TV celebrity chef, Kotori is often left alone at home. Despite being a restaurant owner's daughter, Kotori's learning capacity for cooking is greatly impeded by her terrible fear of knives (the trauma of cutting herself badly as a child still persists). A chance encounter with Kohei (who at that time wasn't aware that she's actually one of his students) and Tsumugi led to the three of them meeting up regularly at her mother's restaurant for the purpose of preparing home cooked meals that they happily partake in afterwards. She enjoys sharing ideas as well as cooking with Kohei and gets along really well with Tsumugi who she treats like a younger sibling. As observed by her best friend Shinobu, Kotori appears to be at her happiest whenever she's cooking food and eating with the Inuzukas.

Shinobu is Kotori's friend from another class, whose family runs a vegetable shop where Megumi often buys vegetables from. In contrast to Kotori's more shy and reserved nature, Shinobu is boisterous and outgoing. She also calls Tsumugi "Tsumu-Tsumu."

Kōhei's friend since high school and childhood friend of Tae. He works at a restaurant. Shinobu usually calls him Yagi-chin and he shows his dislike of that title, being that he is older than her. Despite his gruff and intimidating exterior, he often gives Kōhei advice when he has trouble and sometimes babysits Tsumugi. 

Kotori's mother who is a celebrity chef. As a result, she is often absent from her restaurant, but usually leaves Kotori recipes to follow when cooking with Kōhei.

Kōhei's wife and Tsumugi's mother, who died six months prior to the story.

Tsumugi's classmate in kindergarten.

Tsumugi's classmate in kindergarten.

Tsumugi's classmate in kindergarten.

A male teacher at Kotori and Shinobu's school.

Media

Manga
Sweetness and Lightning, written and illustrated by Gido Amagakure, was serialized in Kodansha's seinen manga magazine Good! Afternoon from February 7, 2013 to August 7, 2018. Kodansha collected its chapters in twelve volumes, released from September 6, 2013 to February 7, 2019.

In North America, the series was licensed for English release by Kodansha USA. The twelve volumes were published from July 26, 2016 to June 4, 2019.

Volume list

Anime
An anime television adaptation was announced in February 2016. The series is produced by TMS Entertainment, directed by Tarou Iwasaki and written by Mitsutaka Hirota, featuring character designs by Hiroki Harada and music by Nobuko Toda. The 12-episode series aired in Japan between July 4, 2016 and September 19, 2016 and was simulcast by Crunchyroll.

Episode list

Reception
Volume 2 reached the 18th place on the weekly Oricon manga chart and, as of March 16, 2014, has sold 60,643 copies; volume 3 reached the 19th place and, as of September 14, 2014, has sold 81,319 copies; and volume 4 reached the 20th place and, as of March 9, 2015, has sold 108,994 copies.

It was number 8 on the 2014 Kono Manga ga Sugoi! Top 20 Manga for Male Readers survey and number 24 on the 15th Book of the Year list by Da Vinci magazine. The series ranked 14th in the first Next Manga Award in the print manga category.

See also
A Galaxy Next Door, another manga series by the same author

Notes

References

External links
Anime official website 

2013 manga
Anime series based on manga
Cooking in anime and manga
Crunchyroll anime
Iyashikei anime and manga
Kodansha manga
Seinen manga
TMS Entertainment